The River City Rollergirls (RCR) is a WFTDA member women's flat track roller derby league based in Richmond, Virginia. The league was established in 2006 and is composed of an all-star travel team The Poe's Punishers and a training travel team, The Uncivil Warriors. The Punishers skate in purple, black and white while the Warriors sport orange, black and yellow.

All-star teams
 Poe's Punishers
-First WFTDA certified team to feature two African-American captains: Paris Kills and Scarriett Tubman.
-Features Freshmeat training group.

Training team
 Uncivil Warriors

References

External links
River City Rollergirls Official website
River City Rollergirls on Facebook
River City Rollergirls on MySpace

Sports in Richmond, Virginia
Roller derby leagues in Virginia
Roller derby leagues established in 2006
Women's sports in the United States
2006 establishments in Virginia